Herman VII, Margrave of Baden-Baden, nicknamed the Rouser, (1266 – 12 July 1291), was the ruling Margrave of Baden from 1288 until his death.

He was the son of Margrave Rudolf I of Baden and his wife, Kunigunde of Eberstein ( – 12 April 1284/90 in Lichtental), the daughter of Count Otto of Eberstein.

In 1291, he received some possessions, including Bietigheim from the Weißenburg Monastery.

He died on 12 July 1291 and was buried in Lichtenthal Abbey.

He married before 6 October 1278, to Agnes of Truhendingen (died after 15 March 1309). They had the following children:
 Frederick II (d. 22 June 1333)
 Rudolf IV, (d. 25 June 1348)
 Herman VIII, (d. 1300)
 Jutta (d. 1327)

See also 
 List of rulers of Baden

Margraves of Baden
1266 births
1291 deaths
13th-century German nobility